Francis Shelley "Frank" White (March 13, 1847August 1, 1922) was a U.S. senator from the state of Alabama. Born in Noxubee County, Mississippi, he became a lawyer and served in the Civil War. He was elected to the Mississippi House of Representatives and then moved to Birmingham, Alabama to practice law. He was elected to fill the term left by the death of Joseph F. Johnston and served from May 11, 1914, to March 4, 1915. He did not run for reelection. His interment was located in Birmingham's Elmwood Cemetery.

References

External links

       

1847 births
1922 deaths
People from Noxubee County, Mississippi
People of Mississippi in the American Civil War
Democratic Party members of the Mississippi House of Representatives
Democratic Party United States senators from Alabama
People from Monroe County, Mississippi